Marios Agathokleous (born September 8, 1974 in Limassol, Cyprus) is a retired Cypriot football striker.

Club career
Agathokleous last played for Thermaikos in the Greek Gamma Ethniki. His former teams are AEL Limassol, Athinaikos, Aris Thessaloniki, Anorthosis Famagusta, APOEL, AEP Paphos Doxa Drama, Panthrakikos and Thermaikos.

International career
Agathokleous made 39 appearances for the Cyprus national football team from 1994 to 2003 and scored 10 goals.

References

External links
 

1974 births
Living people
Cypriot footballers
Cyprus international footballers
Anorthosis Famagusta F.C. players
APOEL FC players
Aris Thessaloniki F.C. players
AEL Limassol players
AEP Paphos FC players
Panthrakikos F.C. players
Athinaikos F.C. players
Association football forwards
Sportspeople from Limassol